Kirby: Squeak Squad, known in Japan as , is a platform video game developed by HAL Laboratory and Flagship and published by Nintendo for the Nintendo DS. It is one of the mainline installment entries of the Kirby series and the second Kirby game released for the system. The game was released in Japan and North America in 2006 and in Europe, Australia, and South Korea in 2007. The game was later re-released for the Wii U's Virtual Console on June 25, 2015.

Gameplay
As in most of his games, Kirby is able to copy the abilities of certain enemies by inhaling and swallowing them. There are also interactive environments, with obstacles that are passable with copy abilities (examples include freezing water to get across with the Ice ability, or cutting down tall tufts of grass with his Sword or Cutter ability). Kirby is also able to collect and store copy abilities and items in his stomach, which is represented on the touch screen. A special power, "Bubble", can be used to create such abilities from the monsters on the screen. The player can combine certain abilities, similar to Kirby 64: The Crystal Shards; however, these are limited to only Sword, Fire, Ice, Spark, and Bomb (although Tornado and Wheel can be imbued with the Fire/Ice/Spark elements when making contact with them in the overworld environment). Mixing abilities is achieved by dragging one ability over another with the stylus. If the two are compatible with each other, they will combine and produce a new ability (example: Fire + Sword = Fire Sword). This can only be done if the scroll (mentioned below) for a certain ability is found. However, if they are not compatible, they will combine to create a random bubble.

As another aspect of the storage and mixing ability, Kirby can acquire subparts of a bonus power item and then mix them to create that bonus item. For example, collecting three mini-Kirbys will grant the player an extra life, while collecting three small stars will generate a large star that can be used for destroying large enemies. Kirby can also store health-restoring items as well.

Returning copy abilities include Beam, Bomb, Cupid, Cutter, Fighter, Fire, Hammer, Hi-Jump, Ice, Laser, Magic, Ninja, Parasol, Sleep, Spark, Sword, Throw, Tornado, U.F.O., and Wheel. New abilities are Animal, Bubble, Ghost, Metal, and Triple Star. Many of the copy abilities feature multiple attacks, a recurring trend also seen in Kirby & the Amazing Mirror.

A new concept to Kirby games introduced in this game are the Copy Scrolls, which power-up any power that Kirby has when chosen. Examples include Hammer growing to nearly double its normal size if charged up, Tornado and Wheel taking the elemental properties of the terrain they pass over, and Spark building up energy that can be released in a similar fashion to the way the Plasma ability from Kirby Super Star worked.

Each level contains one or more treasure chests (usually each level contains two small red chests and a large blue chest, although boss levels only contain one big blue chest), with the ultimate goal of the game to collect all the chests; the chests include keys needed to unlock secret levels and worlds, the ability to change Kirby's color, portions of a jigsaw puzzle picture, and more additional game content; these are awarded when the player successfully completes the level with that chest. The player will need to make sure they have enough space in Kirby's stomach to store the chests, removing unneeded items or combining similar items to make space. The larger chests are generally more difficult to obtain, and require Kirby to face a member of the Squeaks in a mini-challenge. If the opponent gets the chest, they will attempt to escape into their own small hideout, but if the player is fast enough, they can follow them into this hideout and attempt to beat them and retrieve the chest. If the player fails to obtain any chests, they are free to go back to any previously completed level to try to retrieve the chest again. Chests already recovered can be collected again, but will contain an item in a bubble. Only five items can be stored at a time.

The game supports multi-card multiplayer and single-card download play for three special mini-games based on the Squeak Squad.

Plot
One day in Dream Land, Kirby attempts to eat a slice of strawberry shortcake. Before he can, however, it is suddenly snatched away by an unseen presence. Kirby immediately suspects King Dedede of committing the same crime again, so he leaves to go confront him. Finding Dedede at the end of World 1, Kirby defeats him in battle, but soon discovers Dedede was not responsible. Immediately after, a group of treasure-thieving mice known as the Squeaks appear. They reveal they were behind Kirby's shortcake being taken. As they flee with Dedede's belongings, an angered Dedede grabs Kirby and hurls him at the Squeaks. All of them fall down a giant hole leading to World 2. The Squeaks, with the cake in tow, flee to their domain on Ice Island, World 6. Kirby gives pursuit through Dream Land, along the way collecting five large star seals. 

At the end of World 6, a battle ensues between Kirby and the leader of the Squeaks, Daroach. Kirby wins the battle, and is about to get the treasure chest supposedly containing his cake when Meta Knight swoops in and snatches the chest away. Meta Knight escapes through a door leading to World 7, and Kirby uses the five star seals to open the door and follow him. Kirby chases Meta Knight to the end of World 7, where a duel between the two rivals ensues on the Halberd, which flies into space. Meta Knight is defeated and Kirby goes to the treasure chest. Before he can open it, though, Daroach flies in and grabs it from him. Daroach opens it, but the chest does not contain Kirby's cake. Instead, a dark-colored cloud emerges, possessing Daroach, who flies off to distant Gamble Galaxy, World 8.

Concerned, Kirby follows, eventually encountering and fighting the possessed Daroach. Once beaten, the darkness lets go of Daroach and floats away in the form of a small, black-colored star. Kirby follows the star, which eventually transforms into its true form - a Dark Matter entity and the ruler of the Underworld, Dark Nebula. It is revealed that the chest was Dark Nebula's prison, and Meta Knight was only trying to keep anyone from opening the chest and releasing Dark Nebula. Kirby defeats Dark Nebula and heads back to Dream Land, while still wondering where his cake went. In a post-credits scene, the Squeaks - who have found the cake and left for parts unknown - send Kirby back his cake as an apology for the trouble they caused and as thanks for saving Daroach. Kirby soon receives his cake, making him happy at last as he begins to eat it.

Reception

Kirby's Squeak Squad received "average" reviews according to the review aggregation website Metacritic. In Japan, Famitsu gave it a score of three eights and one seven for a total of 31 out of 40.

Criticisms concerned the lack of originality in the title when compared to the previous Kirby game on the Nintendo DS, Kirby: Canvas Curse. Television show X-Play criticized the game for weak minigames and unnecessary use of the touchscreen. The British Official Nintendo Magazine gave the game, on its European release, a score of 70%. Even though reviews were mixed, Kirby: Squeak Squad managed to sell over 2.2 million copies, with one million copies sold in Japan alone.

Rerelease
The game was later released on the Wii U's Virtual Console service in Europe on June 25, 2015; in Australia on June 26, 2015; in North America on July 30, 2015; and in Japan on September 9, 2015.

Notes 

 Known in Europe as Kirby: Mouse Attack

 Known in South Korea as Byeol-ui Kirby: Dopang Ildang-ui Seupgyeok

References

External links
 Kirby: Squeak Squad minisite (Japan)
 Kirby: Squeak Squad minisite (Korean / Web Archive)
 

2006 video games
Flagship (company) games
HAL Laboratory games
Nintendo DS games
Kirby (series) platform games
Multiplayer and single-player video games
Video games developed in Japan
Video games about magic
Virtual Console games
Virtual Console games for Wii U
Video games about mice and rats
Video games scored by Hirokazu Ando
Video games scored by Shogo Sakai
Video games scored by Tadashi Ikegami
Video games scored by Jun Ishikawa
Video games produced by Kensuke Tanabe